Emit is an unincorporated community in Johnston County, North Carolina, United States, situated at the intersection of North Carolina Highway 39 and North Carolina Highway 231. It lies at an elevation of 285 feet (87 m).

Notable person
Pro wrestler C. W. Anderson is from Emit.

References

Unincorporated communities in Johnston County, North Carolina
Unincorporated communities in North Carolina